Ilaskhan-Yurt (Ilsxan-Yurt) is a rural locality (a selo) in the Kurchaloyevsky District in the Chechen Republic, Russia. Population:

References

Rural localities in Kurchaloyevsky District